The 1947 Pacific typhoon season has no official bounds; it ran year-round in 1947, but most tropical cyclones tend to form in the northwestern Pacific Ocean between June and December. These dates conventionally delimit the period of each year when most tropical cyclones form in the northwestern Pacific Ocean.

The scope of this article is limited to the Pacific Ocean, north of the equator and west of the International Date Line. Storms that form east of the date line and north of the equator are called hurricanes; see 1947 Pacific hurricane season. At the time, tropical storms that formed within this region of the western Pacific were identified and named by the United States Armed Services, and these names are taken from the list that USAS publicly adopted before the 1945 season started.

Storms

Tropical Storm Anna

Anna originated from a vigorous tropical wave that moved west along the ITCZ during the days of March 16 and 17. On March 18 an approaching cold front caused the wave to congeal into a tropical low pressure system while about 415 miles (670 km) to the east of Davao. The system rapidly organized into a tropical storm and continued west. Anna made landfall on Mindanao on March 20 as a tropical depression and weakened quickly thereafter.

Little data is available for this system, however, the U.S. Air Weather Service noted that the storm was of little significance.

Typhoon Bernida

The Joint Typhoon Warning center (JTWC) best tracks lists this system as 02W

Typhoon Carol

Carol formed east of the Philippines on June 17. It moved northwest and skimmed right past the most northern island as a 115 mph typhoon. After that, it began to weaken. Carol passed by Taiwan, and was about to hit mainland China, but it suddenly took a northeast track. Shortly thereafter, Carol dissipated on June 23.

The Joint Typhoon Warning center (JTWC) best tracks lists this system as 03W.

Tropical Storm Donna

The Joint Typhoon Warning center (JTWC) best tracks lists this system as 04W

Tropical Storm Eileen

The Joint Typhoon Warning Center (JTWC) Best Tracks lists this system as 05W

Tropical Storm Faith

Typhoon Gwen

Typhoon Helena

Typhoon Inez

Tropical Storm Joyce

Typhoon Kathleen

Typhoon Kathleen struck the Boso Peninsula and the entire Kanto Region in Japan on September 15. Heavy rains caused the Arakawa and Tone Rivers to overflow. The resulting floods killed 1,077 people and left 853 people missing.

Typhoon Laura

Typhoon Mildred

Typhoon Nanette

Typhoon Olive

Typhoon Pauline

Super Typhoon Rosalind

The origins of Rosalind can be track on a tropical storm that intensified into a category 2 on October 6 and named Rosalind. Therefore, Rosalind continued to rapidly intensify from 964 to 918 mbar, reaching its peak intensity. After Rosalind reaches its peak intensity, slight wind shear causes Rosalind to weaken on a category 2 on October 10. It intensified into a category 3 before it moved slowly. It weakened to a category 1 and tropical storm. Rosalind dissipated on October 14.

Rosalind was the first super typhoon ever recorded in the Pacific Ocean.

Typhoon Alice

Tropical Storm Beatrice

Typhoon Cathy

Typhoon Dora

Tropical Storm Elnora

Typhoon Flora

Typhoon Gladys

Typhoon Hannah

Tropical Storm Irene

Tropical Storm Irene formed on November 30 between the Philippine Islands. It strengthened to a tropical storm with 50 mph winds before it made landfall on one of the islands. It curved northeast and weakened to a tropical depression. But after exiting land, it restrengthened to a moderate tropical storm. But shortly thereafter, it became extratropical on December 3. The Japan Meteorological Agency analyzed it as a tropical depression, though it was actually a moderate tropical storm.

Typhoon Jean

Typhoon Jean struck Manila during Christmas after forming in the Philippine sea moving West-northwest and accelerating as it makes landfall in the border area of Albay and Camarines sur. The storm continued its fast movement and track towards southern Manila.
After passing Manila the storm emerges from the coast of Zambales towards the south china sea starting to shift more towards the northwest and eventually north and northeast. All the way moving parallel to the coast of Luzon. The typhoon weakened into a tropical storm and recurved west of Batanes island and passed through the Bashi channel south of Taiwan and continued north-eastward towards Miyakojima and the southern Japanese islands and eventually dissipating on the 29th of December. No data is available on what happened to the system after turning post-tropical.
The curved track of Typhoon Jean is somewhat similar to that of Typhoon Flora the month before.
Because Typhoon Jean battered Manila during Christmas there were reports of Christmas decorations being strewn around the city. 
There were also reports of wind damage in Parañaque city. It was the first recorded incident of typhoons impacting the country at the time of Christmas with the others being Typhoon Lee in 1981, Typhoon Nock-Ten in 2016, an unnamed typhoon in 1918, and Typhoon Phanfone in 2019.

Storm names

See also

 1947 Atlantic hurricane season
 List of Pacific typhoon seasons
 1900–1950 South-West Indian Ocean cyclone seasons
 1940s Australian region cyclone seasons
 1940s South Pacific cyclone seasons

References

External links 
 Unisys Tropical Cyclone Data for 1947

1947
1947 natural disasters
1947 meteorology
1947 in Asia
1947 in Oceania